Byrd Prillerman (October 19, 1859April 25, 1929) was an American educator and school administrator. Prillerman was the fourth principal of the West Virginia Collegiate Institute (present-day West Virginia State University) from 1909 until 1919 and is considered by West Virginia State as the institution's fourth president. Byrd Prillerman School in Raleigh County, West Virginia, was named for him. The school burned in 1962 and was not rebuilt. A scholarship has been established commemorating the school. Prillerman Hall at West Virginia State University is named for him.

Prillerman taught at West Virginia Collegiate Institute before becoming its president. John Warren Davis succeeded him as president. He served as its president from 1909 to 1919.

References

Explanatory notes

Citations

External links

1859 births
1929 deaths
19th-century African-American people
19th-century American educators
20th-century African-American academics
20th-century American academics
Academics from Virginia
Academics from West Virginia
African-American academic administrators
American freedmen
Educators from Charleston, West Virginia
Educators from Virginia
Heads of universities and colleges in the United States
People from Franklin County, Virginia
People from Institute, West Virginia
Presidents of West Virginia State University
West Virginia State University faculty